Francisco Rabal Valera (8 March 1926 – 29 August 2001), better known as Paco Rabal, was a Spanish actor, director, and screenwriter born in Águilas, a town in the south-western part of the province of Murcia, Spain. Throughout his career, Rabal appeared in around 200 films working with directors including Francesc Rovira-Beleta, Luis Buñuel, José Luis Sáenz de Heredia, Carlos Saura, Pedro Almodóvar, William Friedkin, Michelangelo Antonioni, Claude Chabrol, Luchino Visconti, and Gillo Pontecorvo. Paco Rabal was recognized both in his native Spain and internationally, winning the Award for Best Actor at the Cannes Film Festival for Los Santos Inocentes and a Goya Award for Best Actor for playing Francisco de Goya in Carlos Saura's Goya en Burdeos. One of Spain's most loved actors, Rabal also was known for his commitment to human rights and other social causes.

Life and career
In 1936, after the Spanish Civil War broke out, Rabal and his family left Murcia and moved to Madrid. Young Francisco had to work as a street salesboy and in a chocolate factory. When he was 13 years old, he left school to work as an electrician at film studios Estudios Chamartín.

Rabal got some sporadic jobs as an extra. Dámaso Alonso and other people advised him to try his luck with a career in theater.

During the following years, he got some roles in theater companies such as Lope de Vega or María Guerrero. It was there that he met actress Asunción Balaguer; they married in 1951 and remained together for the rest of Rabal's life. Their daughter, Teresa Rabal, is also an actress.

In 1947, Rabal got some regular jobs in theater. He used his full name, Francisco Rabal, as his stage name. However, the people who knew him always called him Paco Rabal (Paco is the familiar form for Francisco.) "Paco Rabal" became his unofficial stage name.

During the 1940s, Rabal began acting in movies as an extra, but it was not until 1950 that he was first cast in speaking roles, and played romantic leads and rogues. He starred in three films directed by Luis Buñuel - Nazarín (1959), Viridiana (1961) and Belle de jour (1967) - with whom he would develop a lifelong friendship.

He was named best actor by the Círculo de Escritores Cinematográficos for El hombre de la isla in 1962.

William Friedkin thought of Rabal for the French villain of his 1971 movie The French Connection. However, he could not remember the name of "that Spanish actor". Mistakenly, his staff hired another Spanish actor, Fernando Rey. Friedkin discovered that Rabal did not speak English or French, so he decided to keep Rey. Rabal had previously worked with Rey in Viridiana. Rabal did, however, work with Friedkin in the much less successful but Academy Award-nominated cult classic Sorcerer (1977), a remake of The Wages of Fear (1953).

Throughout his career, Rabal worked in France, Italy and Mexico with directors such as Gillo Pontecorvo, Michelangelo Antonioni, Luchino Visconti, Valerio Zurlini, Jacques Rivette, Alberto Lattuada and Silvano Agosti.

It is widely considered that Rabal's best performances came after Francisco Franco's death in 1975. In the 1980s, Rabal starred in Los Santos Inocentes - winning the Award for Best Actor at the Cannes Film Festival - in El Disputado Voto del Señor Cayo and also in the TV series Juncal. In 1989, he was a member of the jury at the 39th Berlin International Film Festival. In 1999 he played the part of Francisco Goya in Carlos Saura's Goya en Burdeos, winning a Goya Award for Best Actor.

Rabal's final movie was Dagon, directed by Stuart Gordon. The film, which was released after Rabal's death in 2001, was dedicated to him. The dedication, which appears before the end credits, reads: "Dedicated to Francisco Rabal, a wonderful actor and even better human being."

Rabal died in 2001 from compensatory dilating emphysema while on an airplane travelling to Bordeaux, returning from having received an Award at the Montreal World Film Festival. His death happened only a few weeks before he was due to collect the lifetime Donostia Award at the San Sebastián International Film Festival. The award was accepted by his grandson, Liberto Rabal, also an actor.

Francisco Rabal is the only Spanish actor to have received an honoris causa doctoral degree from the University of Murcia. Murcia's Film Library and Cinematheque, Filmoteca Regional Francisco Rabal, created in 2004 as a meeting point for movie lovers, was named after him.

Selected filmography

La rueda de la vida (1942) - Bronquista de pelea en salón (uncredited)
The Prodigal Woman (1946)
El crimen de Pepe Conde (1946)
Don Quijote de la Mancha (1947) - (uncredited)
Alhucemas (1948) - Tostado (uncredited)
Revelación (1948)
The Honesty of the Lock (1950) - Ernesto
María Antonia 'La Caramba''' (1951)Doubt (1951) - Rafael FigueroaMaría Morena (1951) - El SevillanoLuna de sangre (1952) - PedroThe Song of Sister Maria (1952) - TomásPerseguidos (1952)Hay un camino a la derecha (1953) - MiguelI Was a Parish Priest (1953) - MartínJudas' Kiss (1954) - Quinto LicinioAll Is Possible in Granada (1954) - Fernando OrtegaHe Died Fifteen Years Ago (1954) - DiegoHistorias de la radio (1955) - GabrielThe Cock Crow (1955) - Padre MillerLa pícara molinera (1955) - Cristóbal Paterna - el molineroRevelation (1955) - Sergio GreskyThe Big Lie (1956) - César NeiraSaranno uomini (1957) - GiacomoAmanecer en Puerta Oscura (1957) - Juan Cuenca  (1957) - AntonioLa grande strada azzurra (1957) - SalvatoreVengeance (1958) - Narrador (voice, uncredited)The Mighty Crusaders (1958) - Tancredi d'AltavillaL'amore più bello (1958) - MarioNight and Dawn (1958) - PedroLos clarines del miedo (1958) - AceitunoTen Ready Rifles (1959) - José IribarrenNazarín (1959) - Padre NazarioLlegaron dos hombres (1959) - SuperintendenteSonatas (1959) - Marqués Javier de BradomínEl hombre de la isla (1960) - Lorenzo 'El moro'Trío de damas (1960) - Alberto Sáinz RobledoCavalcata selvaggia (1960)At Five in the Afternoon (1960) - Juan ReyesAzahares rojos (1961) - Arturo Gómez ManceraLa sed (1961)Viridiana (1961) - JorgeLa Mano en la trampa (1961) - Cristóbal AchávalTiro al piccione (1961) - EliaHijo de Hombre (1961) - Vito Ribera - un famoso bandito sicilianoL'Eclisse (1962) - RiccardoSetenta veces siete (1962) - Pascual / The HorsethiefFra Diavolo (1962) - Fra Diavolo
 Mathias Sandorf (1963) - Frédéric de RotenbourgNoche de verano (1963) - BernardoThe Reunion (1963) - AlbertoAutopsy of a Criminal (1963) - CarlosLe gros coup (1964) - Michel ArlandLlanto por un bandido (1963) - José María 'El Tempranillo'L'autre femme (1964) - ZaylorIntimidad de los parques (1965)El Diablo también llora (1965) - TomásCurrito of the Cross (1965) - Manuel Carmona
 Legacy of the Incas (1965) - GambusinoMarie-Chantal contre le docteur Kha (1965) - Paco CastilloMaría Rosa (1965) - MarsalLa Religieuse (1966) - Dom MorelHoy como ayer (1966) - RamónRoad to Rocío (1966) - José AntonioLe Streghe (1967) - Paolo (Segment "Strega Bruciata Viva, La")Long Days of Vengeance (1967) - Sceriffo DouglasBelle de Jour (1967) - HyppoliteCervantes (1967) - Rodrigo CervantesOscuros sueños de agosto (1968) - JulioSpain Again (1968) - Reportero (uncredited)Después del diluvio (1968) - PedroBlood in the Bullring (1969) - Juan CarmonaEl Che Guevara (1968) - Che GuevaraCervantes (1968)A Decent Adultery (1969) - Conserje (uncredited)Simón Bolívar (1969) - gen. José Antonio Del LlanoEl largo día del águila (1969) - Martin DonovanAnn and Eve (1970) - FrancescoCutting Heads (1970) - Díaz IIGoya, a Story of Solitude (1970) - GoyaLa grande scrofa nera (1971) - Il MedicoEl apartamento de la tentación (1971) - Hombre que se cruza con Julieta (uncredited)N.P. - Il segreto (1971) - engineer N.P.Las melancólicas (1971)Nothing Less Than a Real Man (1972) - Alejandro GómezLaia (1972) - QuelotIt Can Be Done Amigo (1972) - FranciscusLe soldat Laforêt (1972) - PacoPianeta Venere (1972) - Party chaufferLa colonna infame (1972) - Giacomo Mora - il barbiereThe Guerrilla (1973) - El CabreroLa Leyenda del Alcalde de Zalamea (1973) - Pedro Crespo, Alcalde de ZalameaLa otra imagen (1973)Counselor at Crime (1973) - Vincent GarofaloThe Devil Is a Woman (1974) - Bishop MarquezLola (1974) - TíoTormento (1974) - Agustín CaballeroDeath Will Have Your Eyes (1974) - Il ricattatoreMetralleta 'Stein' (1975) - Comisario Emilio MendozaCacique Bandeira (1975) - Azevedo BandeiraFaccia di spia (1975) - Mehdi Ben BarkaLas bodas de Blanca (1975) - AntonioAttenti al buffone (1976) - EminenceLa peccatrice (1975) - 'Turco'Las largas vacaciones del 36 (1976) - El MaestroEmilia... parada y fonda (1976)The Desert of the Tartars (1976) - Marshal TronkSorcerer (1977) - NiloIl prefetto di ferro (1977) - Il brigante AlbanesePensione paura (1978) - Marta's loverYo soy mia (1978) - Padre di OrioEl buscón (1979) - MataAsí como eres (1978) - LorenzoCorleone (1978) - Don Giusto ProvenzanoHunted City (1979) - Don AlfonsoCiao cialtroni! (1979)El buscón (1979) - MataUnder Siege (1980) - William LombardThe Rebel (1980) - TonyEl gran secreto (1980) - DomingoSpeed Driver (1980) - EspositoNightmare City (1980) - Major Warren HolmesBuitres sobre la ciudad (1981) - Bender (1981) - GiacomoSal Gorda (1982)La colmena (1982) - Ricardo SorbedoTreasure of the Four Crowns (1983) - SócratesVictòria! La gran aventura d'un poble (1983) - Coronel MárquezTruhanes (1983) - Ginés Jiménez ValeraVictòria! 2: La disbauxa del 17 (1983) - Coronel MárquezEscapada Final (1983)Epílogo (1984) - RocabrunoVictòria! 3: El seny i la rauxa (1984) - Coronel MárquezSal gorda (1984) - GabinoLos santos inocentes (1984) - AzaríasLos zancos (1984) - ManuelFuturo imperfecto (1985)Padre nuestro (1985) - AbelLuces de Bohemia (1985) - Max EstrellaThe Old Music (1985) - Domingo FerreiroMarbella, un golpe de cinco estrellas (1985) - JuanLos paraísos perdidos (1985) - El político ancianoLa hora bruja (1985) - CésarEscapada final (Scapegoat) (1985) - Comisario CárdenasCamorra: Contacto en Nápoles (1985) - GuaglioneTiempo de silencio (1986) - MuecasEl hermano bastardo de Dios (1986) - RosendoEl disputado voto del señor Cayo (1986) - Señor CayoDivinas palabras (1987) - Pedro GailoGallego (1988) - FabiánA Time of Destiny (1988) - Jorge LarranetaEl aire de un crimen (1988) - Coronel OlveraTorquemada (1989) - TorquemadaBarroco (1989) - El HispanoLa Blanca Paloma (1989) - Domingo¡Átame! (1989) - Máximo EspejoLa taberna fantástica (1991)El hombre que perdió su sombra (1991) - AntonioL'autre (1991) - SimmManuel, le fils emprunté (1991) - AlvarezLa Lola se va a los puertos (1993) - Don DiegoOne Hundred and One Nights (1995) - La voix de Buñuel (voice)El palomo cojo (1995) - Tío RicardoAsí en el cielo como en la tierra (1995) - San PedroFelicidades, Tovarich (1995) - AbueloOedipo alcalde (1996) - TiresiasDay and Night (1997) - CristobalAirbag (1997) - VillambrosaPequeños milagros (1997) - Don FranciscoPajarico (1997) - El AbueloLa novia de medianoche (1997) - Wenceslao CorredoiraWater Easy Reach (1998)El evangelio de las maravillas (1998) - Papá BasilioTalk of Angels (1998) - Don JorgeGoya en Burdeos (1999) - GoyaTú qué harías por amor (1999) - Don VicentePeixe-Lua (2000) - Tio NiniDivertimento (2000) - Bernardo GablerLázaro de Tormes (2001) - El CiegoOff to the Revolution by a 2CV (2001) - zio EnriqueDagon (2001; Final film before death) - EzequielLas noches de Constantinopla (2001) - Doña Eugenoia's brotherEl sueño del caimán (2001) - AncianoTorero, fra sogno e realtà (2001) - NarratorZero/infinito'' (2002) - (voice) (final film role)

References

External links

1926 births
2001 deaths
Best Actor Goya Award winners
Cannes Film Festival Award for Best Actor winners
Spanish male film actors
Spanish male stage actors
Spanish male television actors
Spanish communists
People from Águilas
20th-century Spanish male actors
Actors from the Region of Murcia